An overhead projector (often abbreviated to OHP), like a film or slide projector, uses light to project an enlarged image on a screen, allowing the view of a small document or picture to be shared with a large audience.

In the overhead projector, the source of the image is a page-sized sheet of transparent plastic film (also known as "foils" or "transparencies") with the image to be projected either printed or hand-written/drawn. These are placed on the glass platen of the projector, which has a light source below it and a projecting mirror and lens assembly above it (hence, "overhead"). They were widely used in education and business before the advent of video projectors.

Optical system

An overhead projector works on the same principle as a slide projector, in which a focusing lens projects light from an illuminated slide onto a projection screen where a real image is formed. However some differences are necessitated by the much larger size of the transparencies used (generally the size of a printed page), and the requirement that the transparency be placed face up (and readable to the presenter). For the latter purpose, the projector includes a mirror just before or after the focusing lens to fold the optical system toward the horizontal. That mirror also accomplishes a reversal of the image in order that the image projected onto the screen corresponds to that of the slide as seen by the presenter looking down at it, rather than a mirror image thereof. Therefore, the transparency is placed face up (toward the mirror and focusing lens), in contrast with a 35mm slide projector or film projector (which lack such a mirror) where the slide's image is non-reversed on the side opposite the focusing lens.

A related invention for enlarging transparent images is the solar camera, but a similar purpose for opaque materials is served by the epidiascope.

Condenser
Since this requires a large optical lens (at least the size of the transparency) but may be of poor optical quality (since the sharpness of the image does not depend on it), a Fresnel lens is employed. The Fresnel lens is located at (or is part of) the glass plate on which the transparency is placed, and serves to redirect most of the light hitting it into a converging cone toward the focusing lens. Without such a condenser at that point, most of the light would miss the focusing lens (or else the focusing lens would have to be very large and prohibitively expensive). Additionally, mirrors or other condensing elements below the Fresnel lens serve to increase the portion of the light bulb's output which reaches the Fresnel lens in the first place. In order to provide sufficient light on the screen, a high intensity bulb is used which often requires fan cooling.

Focus adjustment
Overhead projectors normally include a manual focusing mechanism which raises and lowers the position of the focusing lens (including the folding mirror) in order to adjust the object distance (optical distance between the slide and the lens) to focus at the chosen image distance (distance to the projection screen) given the fixed focal length of the focusing lens. This permits a range of projection distances.

Increasing (or decreasing) the projection distance increases (or decreases) the focusing system's magnification in order to fit the projection screen in use (or sometimes just to accommodate the room setup). Increasing the projection distance also means that the same amount of light is spread over a larger screen, resulting in a dimmer image. With a change in the projection distance, the focusing must be readjusted for a sharp image. However, the condensing optics (Fresnel lens) is optimized for one particular vertical position of the lens, corresponding to one projection distance. Therefore, when it is focused for a greatly different projection distance, part of the light cone projected by the Fresnel lens towards the focusing lens misses that lens. This has the greatest effect towards the outer edges of the projected image, so that one typically sees either blue or brown fringing at the edge of the screen when the focus is towards an extreme. Using the projector near its recommended projection distance allows a focusing position where this is avoided and the intensity across the screen is approximately uniform.

Source of illumination
The lamp technology of an overhead projector is typically very simple compared to a modern LCD or DLP video projector. Most overheads use an extremely high-power halogen lamp that may consume up to 750 or 1000 watts. A high-flow blower is required to keep the bulb from melting due to the heat generated, and this blower is often on a timer that keeps it running for a period after the light is extinguished.

Further, the intense heat accelerates failure of the high intensity lamp, often burning out in less than 100 hours, requiring replacement, which is often the most expensive part of owning a projector. In contrast, a modern LCD or DLP projector often uses an Ultra-high-performance lamp which has a higher luminous efficacy and lasts for thousands of hours. A drawback of that technology is the warm up time required for such lamps.

Older overhead projectors used a tubular quartz bulb which was mounted above a bowl-shaped polished reflector. However, because the lamp was suspended above and outside the reflector, a large amount of light was cast to the sides inside the projector body that was wasted, thus requiring a higher power lamp for sufficient screen illumination. More modern overhead projectors use an integrated lamp and conical reflector assembly, allowing the lamp to be located deep within the reflector and sending a greater portion of its light towards the Fresnel lens; this permits using a lower power lamp for the same screen illumination.

A useful innovation for overhead projectors with integrated lamps/reflectors is the quick-swap dual-lamp control, allowing two lamps to be installed in the projector in movable sockets. If one lamp fails during a presentation the presenter can merely move a lever to slide the spare into position and continue with the presentation, without needing to open the projection unit or waiting for the failed bulb to cool before replacing it.

History
Some ancient projectors like the magic lantern can be regarded as predecessors of the overhead projector. The steganographic mirror possibly came closest to how the overhead projector was used.

German Jesuit scholar Athanasius Kircher's 1645 book Ars Magna Lucis et Umbrae included a description of his invention, the "Steganographic Mirror": a primitive projection system with a focusing lens and text or pictures painted on a concave mirror reflecting sunlight, mostly intended for long distance communication. In 1654 Belgian Jesuit mathematician André Tacquet used Kircher's technique to show the journey from China to Belgium of Italian Jesuit missionary Martino Martini. It is unknown how exactly Tacquet used Kircher's system, but it is imagined that he drew pictures on the projecting mirror while details of the journey were explained.

The "solar microscope" was employed in early photographic experiments with photosensitive silver nitrate by Thomas Wedgwood and Humphry Davy in making the first, but impermanent, enlargements of minute objects.

French physicist Edmond Becquerel developed the first known overhead projection apparatus in 1853. It was demonstrated by French instrument maker and inventor Jules Duboscq in 1866.

Subsequently, in 1857 Baltimore painter David Acheson Woodward' patented a solar enlarging camera, a large instrument operated out-of-doors. It used sunlight and copying lenses for enlargements from a small negative onto large photographically sensitized paper or canvas. Portrait artists found it a boon that provided a guide in making accurate likenesses which they would paint in oils, watercolour or pastel over the enlargement, often made at life size.

An overhead projector designed by American scientist Henry Morton was marketed around 1880 as a "vertical lantern".

The use of transparent sheets for overhead projection, called viewfoils or viewgraphs, was largely developed in the United States. Overhead projectors were introduced into U.S. military training during World War II as early as 1940 and were quickly being taken up by tertiary educators, and within the decade they were being used in corporations. After the war they were used at schools like the U.S. Military Academy. The journal Higher Education of April 1952 noted;

Allied to the US Navy development of the improved lightweight overhead projector was its adaptation of the Ozalid dry printing process, developed in Germany in 1923, to copy training documents and illustrations on projection transparencies, a process simple enough to be carried out in the field and which ensured uniformity of instructional material used.

Overhead projectors were used early on for police work with a cellophane roll over a 9-inch stage, allowing facial characteristics to be rolled across the stage.

As the demand for projectors grew, Buhl Industries was founded in 1953, and became the leading US contributor for several optical refinements for the overhead projector and its projection lens.

Overhead projectors began to be widely used in schools and businesses in the late 1950s and early 1960s, beside the contemporaneously-developed carousel slide projectors with a horizontally mounted tray manufactured by Kodak.

In the late 1950s Roger Appeldorn was challenged by his boss at 3M to find a use for the transparencies that were the waste of their color copy process. Appeldorn developed a process for the projection of transparent sheets that led to 3M's first marketable transparency film. The Strategic Air Command base in Omaha was one of the first big clients, using circa 20,000 sheets per month. 3M then decided to develop their own overhead projector instead of the one they had been selling until then, which was produced by an outside manufacturer. It took several prototypes before a cost-effective, small and foldable version could be presented on January 15, 1962. It had a new fresnel lens made with a structured-surface plastic, much better than other plastic lenses and much cheaper than glass.
In 1957, the United States' first Federal Aid to Education program stimulated overhead sales which remained high up to the late 1990s and into the 21st Century.

Use in education 
Overhead projectors were widely used in education and business before the advent of computer-based projection.

The overhead projector facilitates an easy low-cost interactive environment for educators. Teaching materials can be pre-printed on plastic sheets, upon which the educator can directly write using a non-permanent, washable color marking pen. This saves time, since the transparency can be pre-printed and used repetitively, rather than having materials written manually before each class.

The overhead is typically placed at a comfortable writing height for the educator and allows the educator to face the class, facilitating better communication between the students and teacher. The enlarging features of the projector allow the educator to write in a comfortable small script in a natural writing position rather than writing in an overly large script on a blackboard and having to constantly hold their arm out in midair to write on the blackboard.

When the transparency sheet is full of written or drawn material, it can simply be replaced with a new, fresh sheet with more pre-printed material, again saving class time vs a blackboard that would need to be erased and teaching materials rewritten by the educator. Following the class period, the transparencies are easily restored to their original unused state by washing off with soap and water.

LCD overhead displays 

In the early 1980s–1990s, overhead projectors were used as part of a classroom computer display/projection system. A liquid-crystal panel mounted in a plastic frame was placed on top of the overhead projector and connected to the video output of the computer, often splitting off the normal monitor output. A cooling fan in the frame of the LCD panel would blow cooling air across the LCD to prevent overheating that would fog the image.

The first of these LCD panels were monochrome-only, and could display NTSC video output such as from an Apple II computer or VCR. In the late 1980s color models became available, capable of "thousands" of colors (16-bit color), for the color Macintosh and VGA PCs. The displays were never particularly fast to refresh or update, resulting in the smearing of fast-moving images, but it was acceptable when nothing else was available.

The Do-It-Yourself community has started using this idea to make low-cost home theater projectors. By removing the casing and backlight assembly of a common LCD monitor, one can use the exposed LCD screen in conjunction with the overhead projector to project the contents of the LCD screen to the wall at a much lower cost than with standard LCD projectors. Due to the mirroring of the image in the head of the overhead projector, the image on the wall is "re-flipped" to where it would be if one was looking at the LCD screen normally.

Decline in use

Overhead projectors were once a common fixture in most classrooms and business conference rooms in the United States, but in the 2000s they were slowly being replaced by document cameras, dedicated computer projection systems and interactive whiteboards. Such systems allow the presenter to project video directly from a computer file, typically produced using software such as Microsoft PowerPoint and LibreOffice. Such presentations can also include animations, interactive components, or even video clips, with ease of paging between slides. The relatively expensive printing or photocopying of color transparencies is eliminated.

The primary reason for this gradual replacement is the deeply ingrained use of computing technology in modern society and the inability of overheads to easily support the features that modern users demand. While an overhead can display static images fairly well, it performs poorly at displaying moving images. The LCD video display panels that were once used as an add-on to an overhead projector have become obsolete, with that combination of display technology and projection optics now optimally integrated into a modern video projector.

The standards of users have also increased, so that a dim, fuzzy overhead projection that is too bright in the center and too dim around the edges is no longer acceptable. The optical focus, linearity, brightness and clarity of an overhead generally cannot match that of a video projector . Video projectors use extremely small picture generation mechanisms, allowing for precision optics that far exceed the plastic fresnel lens' optical performance. They also include additional optics that eliminate the hotspot in the center of the screen directly above the light source, so that the brightness is uniform everywhere on the projection screen.

Critics feel that there are some downsides as these technologies are more prone to failure and have a much steeper learning curve for the user than a standard overhead projector.

See also
 Opaque projector
 Slide projector
 Slide show
 Telestrator
 Transparency (projection)

Bibliography

References

External links

Projectors
Office equipment
Display devices
Educational technology